= Abayab Nattyadal =

- Formation: 4 April 1997
- Type: Theatre group
- Location: Dhaka, Bangladesh

Abayab Nattyadal is a Bangladeshi Bengali theatre group. The group was founded on 4 April 1997. The theatre group has staged more than 20 plays. Their first play was Khun.

== Productions ==
(in alphabetical order)

- Bhimrati
- Bhumadhyasagar
- Khun
